Routes to Work South is a welfare-to-work subcontractor based in South Lanarkshire, Scotland. South Lanarkshire residents are often referred to the organisation by their local Job Centre, but individuals are also 'encouraged' to contact it themselves. Routes To Work South has offices in Cambuslang, East Kilbride, Hamilton and Lanark.

Current projects
The company has many different 'bespoke' welfare-to-work programmes operating within the framework of those of the DWP including South Lanarkshire Jobs Fund, Making it Work, Job Brokers, Employability, and Employer Service Consultants.

References

External links
Routes To Work South
South Lanarkshire Council
s1jobs
Employability in Scotland

South Lanarkshire
Employment agencies of the United Kingdom
Charities based in Scotland